Egil Borgen Johansen (14 March 1934 – 5 March 1993) was a Norwegian archer. He was born in Stavern in Larvik. He competed in archery at the 1972 Summer Olympics in Munich.

References

External links
 

1934 births
1993 deaths
People from Larvik
Norwegian male archers
Olympic archers of Norway
Archers at the 1972 Summer Olympics
Sportspeople from Vestfold og Telemark